Sadullapur is an upazila of Gaibandha District in the Division of Rangpur, Bangladesh.

Geography
It has 47,102 homes and a total area of 227.97 km2.

Demographics
As of the 1991 Bangladesh census, Sadullapur has a population of 243,012. Males constitute 50.4% of the population, and females 49.6%. The upazila's adult population, over 18 years, is 117,347. Sadullapur has an average literacy rate of 25.1% (7+ years), below the national average of 32.4%. The literacy rate of this upazila is 89.3.

Administration
Sadullapur Upazila is divided into 11 union parishads: Bongram, Damodorpur, Dhaperhat, Faridpur, Idilpur, Jamalpur, Kamarpara, Khodkomor, Noldanga, Rasulpur, and Vatgram. The union parishads are subdivided into 166 mauzas and 169 villages.

Notable people
 Maqbular Rahman Sarkar (1928–1985), academic and tenth vice-chancellor of Rajshahi University

See also
Dhaperhat Union
Districts of Bangladesh
Divisions of Bangladesh
Upazilas of Bangladesh

References

 
Upazilas of Gaibandha District
Districts of Bangladesh